Zatrephes fasciola is a moth in the family Erebidae. It was described by Adalbert Seitz in 1922. It is found in Brazil.

References

Phaegopterina
Moths described in 1922